David S. Scannell (1820 – March 30, 1893) was an American firefighter, law enforcement official, and veteran of the Mexican–American War.

Biography 
Scannell was born in New York City in 1820, and began working as a volunteer firefighter when he was just twelve years old. 

In 1846 he volunteered to fight during the Mexican–American War, and was commissioned as a Lieutenant in the 2nd Regiment of Foot of New York.  His unit fought at the battles of Veracruz, Cerro Gordo, Contreras, Churubusco, Chapultepec and Garita de Belen. His unit experienced extremely heavy casualties, but Scannell returned to New York uninjured.

In 1851 he moved from New York to California during the California Gold Rush. He joined San Francisco's volunteer fire department, and enrolled in a local militia. 

Scannell was San Francisco's third elected Sheriff, serving from 1855 to 1856. When San Francisco Fire Department transitioned from an organization staffed by volunteers to one staffed by full-time paid staff Scannell served as its first fire chief.

Death and legacy 
Scannell died on March 30, 1893 in San Francisco. He was buried in Lone Mountain Cemetery. His remains were moved to Cypress Lawn Memorial Park in Colma, California before 1941.

Scannell's will and testament established an award, the David S. Scannell Medal, to be given annually to an outstanding San Francisco firefighter. In 1909, the city named a fireboat after him, the David Scanell.

References

1820 births
1893 deaths
American fire chiefs
People from New York City
Burials at Laurel Hill Cemetery (San Francisco)
Burials at Cypress Lawn Memorial Park
People from San Francisco
American people of the Mexican–American War
California sheriffs